Baracus is a monotypic genus of grass skippers in the family Hesperiidae.

Species
Baracus vittatus (Felder, 1862)

References
Natural History Museum Lepidoptera genus database

Hesperiinae
Hesperiidae genera